The South East Air Support Unit was a joint consortium established to provide police aviation for Sussex Police, Surrey Police and Hampshire Constabulary. It was formed in October 2010 and gained a single Police Air Operator's Certificate on 1 April 2011. It was previously managed by Inspector Steve Cheeseman, and operated from  RAF Odiham in Hampshire and Brighton City Airport in Sussex. In 2012, the unit was absorbed into the National Police Air Service, which now provides all the police air support in England and Wales.

See also
 Police aviation
 Police aviation in the United Kingdom

References

Police aviation units of the United Kingdom
Defunct organisations based in the United Kingdom
2010 establishments in England
2011 disestablishments in England